Old Neck Historic District is a national historic district located at Belvidere, near Hertford, Perquimans County, North Carolina.  The district encompasses 44 contributing buildings, 5 contributing sites, 12 contributing structures, and 1 contributing object in a rural agricultural area near Hertford. The district developed between about 1813 and 1946, and includes notable examples of Federal and Greek Revival, and Colonial Revival style architecture. Located in the district are the separately listed Fletcher-Skinner-Nixon Plantation and Cove Grove Plantation.  Other notable buildings include the Francis Nixon Plantation, William Jones Plantation, Thomas Nixon Plantation, Winslow Farm, John Newbold Farm, and Matthew Towe Farm.

The house was added to the National Register of Historic Places in 1996.

References

Historic districts on the National Register of Historic Places in North Carolina
Federal architecture in North Carolina
Greek Revival architecture in North Carolina
Colonial Revival architecture in North Carolina
Buildings and structures in Perquimans County, North Carolina
National Register of Historic Places in Perquimans County, North Carolina